Pterostylis petrosa, commonly known as the Riverina rustyhood, is a plant in the orchid family Orchidaceae and is endemic to New South Wales. It has a rosette of leaves at its base and up to eight dark brown flowers with transparent "windows", long spreading tips on the lateral sepals and a thin, brown, insect-like labellum.

Description
Pterostylis petrosa, is a terrestrial,  perennial, deciduous, herb with an underground tuber. The leaves are often withered by the time of flowering. There are between two and four stem leaves with their bases wrapped around the flowering spike. The lateral sepals are turned downwards and are wider than the galea. They are shallowly dished, hairy on their outer edges and suddenly taper to a thread-like tip, . Flowering occurs from September to November.

Taxonomy and naming
Pterostylis petrosa was first formally described in 1983 by David Jones and Mark Clements from a specimen collected near The Rock and the description was published in Muelleria. The specific epithet (petrosa) is a Latin word meaning "rocky" or "stony", referring to the habitat where this orchid grows, and to the type location.

Distribution and habitat
The Riverina rustyhood occurs in the Riverina area where it grows on a few stony hills in rock crevices and on ledges.

References

petrosa
Endemic orchids of Australia
Orchids of New South Wales
Plants described in 1983